Sergei Bubka was the defending champion; however, he lost 0–6, 6–4 6–7(3–7) to Yuichi Sugita in the second round.
Sugita defeated Matthew Ebden in the final (4–6, 6–4, 6–1).

Seeds

Draw

Finals

Top half

Bottom half

External links
 Main Draw
 Qualifying Draw

Shimadzu All Japan Indoor Tennis Championships - Singles
2010 Singles